Cyprichromini is a tribe of African cichlids, containing seven species in two genera: Cyprichromis and Paracyprichromis. Most species are endemic to Lake Tanganyika; only C. microlepidotus has also been seen in eastern Tanzania.

The members of this tribe are small elongated fish found in schools in open waters where they feed on plankton. They are mouthbrooders.

References

External links

 Phylogenetic analysis of Cyprichromini (Perciformes: Cichlidae) endemic to Lake Tanganyika and validation of the genus Paracyprichromis
 Mitochondrial phylogeny of the Cyprichromini, a lineage of open-water cichlid fishes endemic to Lake Tanganyika, East Africa

 
Pseudocrenilabrinae
Fish tribes
Cichlid fish of Africa